Krzysztof Ślęczka (18 July 1956 - 7 April 2022) was a Polish Paralympic swimmer who competed in international level events.

References

1956 births
Living people
People from Czechowice-Dziedzice
People from Nowa Sól
Paralympic swimmers of Poland
Swimmers at the 1984 Summer Paralympics
Swimmers at the 1988 Summer Paralympics
Swimmers at the 1992 Summer Paralympics
Swimmers at the 1996 Summer Paralympics
Swimmers at the 2000 Summer Paralympics
Medalists at the 1984 Summer Paralympics
Medalists at the 1988 Summer Paralympics
Medalists at the 1992 Summer Paralympics
Medalists at the 1996 Summer Paralympics
Medalists at the 2000 Summer Paralympics
Paralympic medalists in swimming
Paralympic gold medalists for Poland
Paralympic silver medalists for Poland
Paralympic bronze medalists for Poland
Polish male freestyle swimmers
Polish male backstroke swimmers
Polish male breaststroke swimmers
Polish male butterfly swimmers
Polish male medley swimmers
S5-classified Paralympic swimmers
20th-century Polish people